The 1980–81 Austrian Hockey League season was the 51st season of the Austrian Hockey League, the top level of ice hockey in Austria. Eight teams participated in the league, and EC VSV won the championship.

First round

Final round

Qualification round

WAT Stadlau avoided relegation as ATSE Graz declined to be promoted.

External links
Austrian Ice Hockey Association

Austria
Austrian Hockey League seasons
League